Insides may refer to:

Insides (band), a British post-rock music duo
Insides (album), a 2009 album by Jon Hopkins
In Sides, a 1996 album by Orbital

See also
Inside (disambiguation)